Apostolepis adhara (common name: São Salvador burrow-snake) is a species of snake in the family Colubridae. It is endemic to Brazil.

References 

adhara
Reptiles described in 2018
Reptiles of Brazil